Border Casino is a Native American gaming establishment operated and owned by the Chickasaw Nation in the state of Oklahoma.

See also
 American Gaming Association
 History of gambling in the United States
 Indian Gaming Regulatory Act
 National Indian Gaming Commission

References

External links
 
 
 

Casinos in Oklahoma
Chickasaw Nation casinos
Buildings and structures in Love County, Oklahoma
Tourist attractions in Love County, Oklahoma